Bari is a Vidhan Sabha constituency of Jajpur district, Odisha.

Area of this constituency includes Bari block and 8 GPs (Badasuar,  Chhatisdebil, Erabanka, Jhalapada, Sanasuar, Rudrapur, Sahaspur and Sujanpur) of Jajpur block and 10GPs (Atalpur, Samantarapur, Routrapur, Prathamakhandi, Rajendrapur, Arthanga, Mangarajpur, Brahmabarada, Bandhadiha and Maheswarpur) of Rasulpur block.

In 2009 election, Biju Janata Dal candidate Debasis Nayak defeated Indian National Congress candidate Naba Kishore Samal by a margin of 11,767 votes.

Elected members

10 elections held during 1974 to 2014. Elected members from the Bari/ (Bari-Derabisi) constituency are:
2019: (49): Sunanda Das (BJD)
2014: (49): Debasis Nayak (BJD)
2009: (49): Debasis Nayak (BJD)
2004: (28): Debasis Nayak (BJD) 
2000: (28): Debasis Nayak (BJD) 
1995: (28): Chinmay Prasad Behera (Congress)
1990: (28): Kulamoni Rout (Janata Dal) 
1985: (28): Srikanta Kumar Jena (Janata Party)
1980: (28): Srikanta Kumar Jena (JNP-SC)
1977: (28): Srikanta Kumar Jena (Janata Party)
1974: (28): Prahlad Malik (Utkal Congress)

2019 election results
In 2019 election, Biju Janata Dal candidate Sunanda Das defeated Bharatiya Janata Party	candidate Biswaranjan Mallick by a margin of 7,173 votes.

2014 election results
In 2014 election, Biju Janata Dal candidate Debasis Nayak defeated Independent candidate Biswaranjan Mallick by a margin of 7,173 votes.

Summary of results of the 2009 election

Notes

References

Assembly constituencies of Odisha
Jajpur district